Adam Griffiths (born 21 August 1979 in Sydney) is an Australian professional football manager who currently serves as the Assistant Coach of Western Sydney Wanderers. He is a former professional  football (soccer) player and Socceroo. Since 2020 he has been Head Coach of National Premiere Leagues NSW side Manly United. In 2022 he turned a difficult season around to come 2nd in the Premiership equal on points to first but missing out by one goal difference. He then took the team into to the Grand Final against Blacktown. Adam was awarded Coach of the year 2022 at the Football NSW Gold Medal Awards. In July 2022 he was appointed to the A- League as Assistant Coach under Mark Rudan at The Western Sydney Wanderers.

Club career
Griffiths played for a number of Australian clubs before moving to Europe with Belgian club Oostende, and later England with Watford. He moved to another English club, League One side Brentford on 11 July 2006.

Griffiths was released by Brentford on 16 May 2007 and rejoined former club Newcastle Jets the next day. His twin brother Joel Griffiths also played for the Newcastle Jets.

He made his A-League debut in Round 1 of the 2007–08 A-League season against Perth Glory, and scored his first goal in the A-League in Round 5 against Melbourne Victory.

As of Thursday 20 November 2008, Griffiths signed for new expansion club Gold Coast United, on a three-year contract starting in the 2009/2010 season.

After playing only one game for Gold Coast, Griffiths moved to Saudi Arabian club Al Shabab, in a deal worth $1.2 million USD a season plus a $650,000 transfer fee. It is now reported that Griffiths will be leaving Al Shabab and returning to Gold Coast under the terms of his deal.

On 3 February 2010, Griffiths signed with Adelaide United for the club's Asian Champions League campaign.

Later in 2010, Griffiths moved to China to join Hangzhou Greentown who he helped clinch qualification for the 2011 AFC Champions League after a fourth-place finish in the 2010 CSL season.

On 4 June 2012, Griffiths signed a 1-year deal with Sydney FC.

However, as a result of Sydney FC failing to qualify for the A-League finals, Griffiths, along with teammates Paul Reid, Krunoslav Lovrek, Trent McClenahan, Nathan Sherlock and Jarrod Kyle were released by Sydney FC at the conclusion of the 2012–13 A-League season.

Subsequently, Adam joined Malaysian side Selangor FA in April 2013 until the end of the 2013 Malaysian football season.

He signed for the APIA Leichhardt for the 2015 season.

Personal life
Adam's twin brother, Joel and younger brother, Ryan, are also professional footballers. Adam is also an artist and up-and-coming film director and writer. He is married to the actress Lily Brown Griffiths.

Coaching career
In 2016 Griffiths transitioned from a professional football player into coaching, joining first division NSW club, Manly United senior program. In 2020 Griffiths became the Head Coach of Manly United mens 1st grade team. In his first full season 2021 he helped steer the club into 3rd position in the league before the season was cut due to COVID disruptions. In the 2022 season Griffiths transformed the team into fast efficient attacking passing team and came within 1 goal difference from Manly United winning the title, finishing 2nd on goal difference. Griffiths achievements attracted the attention of Mark Rudan, Head Coach of Western Sydney Wanderers and on the 5th of July Griffiths was appointed Assistant Coach of A-League Men club Western Sydney Wanderers.

References

External links
 Adelaide United profile
 FFA – Socceroo profile
 Oz Football profile

1979 births
Living people
Soccer players from Sydney
Australian people of Welsh descent
Australian expatriate soccer players
Australia international soccer players
Association football defenders
Association football midfielders
Association football utility players
National Soccer League (Australia) players
AFC Bournemouth players
Brentford F.C. players
Adelaide United FC players
Gold Coast United FC players
Newcastle Jets FC players
Watford F.C. players
Sutherland Sharks FC players
Northern Spirit FC players
Al-Shabab FC (Riyadh) players
Zhejiang Professional F.C. players
Expatriate footballers in China
Expatriate footballers in Malaysia
Expatriate footballers in Saudi Arabia
Sydney FC players
Sydney United 58 FC players
Selangor FA players
Manly United FC players
Chinese Super League players
Saudi Professional League players
Gippsland Falcons players
Australian soccer players
Australian expatriate sportspeople in Saudi Arabia